Copelatus montivagus is a species of diving beetle. It is part of the genus Copelatus, which is in the subfamily Copelatinae of the family Dytiscidae. It was described by Young in 1942.

References

montivagus
Beetles described in 1942